Yadana Zedi Sinmya Shin Pagoda is a relic pagoda built by King Mohnyin Thado of Ava (Inwa) in 1431 in Sagaing, Myanmar.

History
King Mohnyin Thado had the five relics, which were brought back from Sri Lanka in 1429/30 by the monks Ashin Sirithaddhama Linkarra and Ashin Sihana Mahasarmi, enshrined in the Yadana Zedi Sinmya Shin Pagoda on 27 January 1431. The pagoda was named Yadana Zedi.

Earthquake Damage
In 1485, the pagoda was damaged by an earthquake. King Minkhaung II had the pagoda repaired and added figures of elephants at the base of the main wall and the entrance. Due to the changes, the pagoda was given the name Sinmya Shin.

In September 2012, the pagoda was damaged yet again by an earthquake.  In addition to repairing cracks in the pagoda and mending precious stones that fell from their places around the pagoda, officials set out to restore damages and wear and tear that had taken place previously.  Restoration for the project was led by the prominent Buddhist monk and scholar Sitagu Sayadaw.

Notes

References

Bibliography
 
 

Pagodas in Myanmar
Buddhist pilgrimage sites in Myanmar
Buildings and structures in Sagaing Region
15th-century Buddhist temples